Vaneyellidae is a family of sea cucumbers belonging to the order Dendrochirotida.

Genera:
 Mitsukuriella Heding & Panning, 1954
 Psolidothuria Thandar, 1998
 Vaneyella Heding & Panning, 1954

References

Dendrochirotida